FEDS Xinyi A13 is a shopping mall located in the Xinyi Planning District of Taipei, Taiwan that started trial operation on 25 December 2019 and officially opened on 19 January 2020. Main core stores include Vieshow Cinemas, Lego Store Taipei (the first Lego certified store in Taiwan) and Apple Store Xinyi A13 (the second Apple Store in Taiwan). The mall's revenue in 2020 is around NT$3.8 billion. This is the 11th store of the Far Eastern Department Stores company.

Design
The building is designed by the Taiwanese architect Kris Yao. The fourth storey food court of the mall presents an architectural image of the 1950s and 60s historical streets of Dadaocheng.

Public transportation
The mall is located in close proximity to Taipei City Hall metro station on the Bannan Line and Taipei 101–World Trade Center metro station on the Tamsui–Xinyi line of the Taipei Metro.

Gallery

See also
 List of tourist attractions in Taiwan
 FEDS Zhubei

References

External links

2020 establishments in Taiwan
Shopping malls in Taipei
Shopping malls established in 2020